A Mother's Gift is a 2001 novel by American singer Britney Spears and her mother Lynne Spears. It is their second book together, following 2000's Heart-to-Heart. The novel is loosely based on Britney's life. Popular reactions to the novel in spaces like Amazon were mixed. In 2012, rumors of a third novel sequel surfaced.

Plot
The story is about a 14-year-old girl named Holly Faye Lovell from a tiny, rural town called Biscay in the U.S. state of Mississippi. She gets accepted as a scholarship student into the exclusive Haverty School of Performing Arts, and the story revolves around Holly's life in Haverty, where she is the poorest student, and her relationship with her mother, Wanda.

Film adaptation
The book was adapted for a 2004 ABC Family television film titled Brave New Girl (the new title comes from a song on Britney's 2003 album In the Zone). Although the plot was drastically changed, Britney was included as an executive producer of the film.

External links

References

2001 American novels
American novels adapted into films
American novels adapted into television shows
Britney Spears
Collaborative novels